Macteola chinoi is a species of sea snail, a marine gastropod mollusc in the family Mangeliidae.

Description
The length of the shell attains 7 mm.

Distribution
This marine species occurs off Mactan Island, the Philippines.

References

 Stahlschmidt P., Fraussen K. & Kilburn R.N. (2012) A new Macteola (Gastropoda: Mangeliidae) from the Philippines. Miscellanea Malacologica 5(4): 77-79.

External links
 
 MNHN, Paris: Macteola chinoi

chinoi
Gastropods described in 2012